Katherine Endacott (born 29 January 1980) is a former British sprinter who competed in the 2010 Commonwealth Games.

References

1980 births
Living people
Sportspeople from Plymouth, Devon
English female sprinters
Athletes (track and field) at the 2010 Commonwealth Games
Commonwealth Games medallists in athletics
Commonwealth Games gold medallists for England
Commonwealth Games silver medallists for England
Medallists at the 2010 Commonwealth Games